FIP or fip may refer to:

Government and politics 
 Federal Identity Program, of the government of Canada
 Forestry Incentive Program, of the United States Department of Agriculture
 FTC Fair Information Practice, guidelines promulgated by the United States Federal Trade Commission

Sport 
 Federation of International Polo, worldwide governing body for polo
 Federazione Italiana Pallacanestro (Italian Basketball Federation), Italian sports body 
 Fielding Independent Pitching, in baseball, one of several defence-independent pitching statistics
 Full Impact Pro, an American professional wrestling promotion
  (International Padel Federation), the international governing body for padel

Other uses
 FIP (radio station), a French radio station
 Factory Instrumentation Protocol, a standardized field bus protocol
 Fédération Internationale de Philatélie, the international philatelic organisation
 Federation of Indian Photography
 Feed-in premium, a policy mechanism to support renewable energy
 Female Iron Pipe, a plumbing pipe connection to an MIP (Male Iron Pipe); see National Pipe Thread
 Financial Intelligence & Processing, a consulting firm
 Finite intersection property, in topology
 Fire Island Pines, New York, United States
 First Independent Pictures, an American motion picture distributor
 Fipa language, a Bantu language of Tanzania
 International Pharmaceutical Federation
 Fire Indicator Panel, on a Fire alarm control panel
 Feline Infectious Peritonitis, a fatal disease that occurs in cats.

See also
FIPI (disambiguation)